Apamea dubitans, the doubtful apamea, is a moth of the  family Noctuidae. It is widely distributed in North America.

The wingspan is about 40 mm. Adults are on wing from June to September depending on the location.

The larvae feed on various grasses.

External links
Images
Bug Guide

	

Apamea (moth)
Moths of North America
Moths described in 1856